

Events

January events
 January – Electrification of the Trans-Siberian Railway, a project begun in 1929, was completed.
 January 1 – E. Hunter Harrison, former president of Illinois Central Railroad (now a subsidiary of CN), succeeds Paul Tellier as president of Canadian National Railway.
 January 18 – Singapore's second LRT Line, Sengkang LRT Line, is opened.
 January 21 – The first segment of High Speed 1 in England is completed.

February events

March events
 March 21 – Official launch of M>Train's new Siemens Nexas trains in Melbourne, Australia.

April events
 April 3 – First revenue run of M>Train's new Siemens Mo-Mo train.
 April 5 – The third rapid transit line of the Philippines which is the Manila Line 2, began partial operations from Santolan Station to Araneta Center–Cubao Station.
 April 11 – M>Train withdrew fleet of Siemens Mo-Mo trains due to braking and traction issues.
 April 26 – DLW completed construction of the first WDP-4 locomotive to be built entirely within India.

May events

June events
 June 20 – North East MRT Line in Singapore opened. It is the world's first fully underground, automated and driverless rapid transit line.
 June 21 – The IE 29000 Class Diesel Multiple Unit commuter train enters service in the Dublin Suburban Area.
 June 22 – Bay Area Rapid Transit opens its extension to Millbrae, where trains interchange with Caltrain services, as well as to San Francisco International Airport.

July events
 July – David Laney was promoted to Chairman of the Board of Directors for Amtrak.
 July 15 – L. Stanley Crane, twice the Railroader of the Year, died of pneumonia at a hospice in Boynton Beach, Fla.
 July 26 – The original Los Angeles County Metropolitan Transportation Authority Gold Line opens for revenue service between Los Angeles Union Station and Sierra Madre Villa.
 July 21 – A tornado knocked down most of the former Erie Railroad's Kinzua Bridge.
 July 30 – Eurostar train number 3313/14 established a new speed record in England at 334.7 km/h (208 mph) on High Speed 1.

August events
 August 9 – Indian Railways began passenger train service between Hyderabad and Secunderabad with 13 trains between Lingampally and Hyderabad, and 11 between Lingampally and Secunderabad.
 August 10
 M>Train (Melbourne, Australia) returned fleet of Siemens trains to service.
 Okinawa Urban Monorail (Yui Rail), Naha Airport Station to Shuri Station route open in Okinawa Island, Japan.
 August 22 – Sound Transit connected to Tacoma, Washington.
 August 31 – Opening of KL Monorail in Kuala Lumpur.

September events
 September 1 – Deutsche Bahn took over operations of shipping company Stinnes Group in Germany.
 September 25 – James J. Dermody became President of Long Island Rail Road in New York.

October events
 October 1 – M>Train (Melbourne, Australia) withdrew its fleet of Siemens trains for the second time.
 October 7 – RENFE opened the Madrid–Lleida section of the system's new standard gauge AVE Madrid–Barcelona high-speed rail line via Zaragoza in Spain.
 October 27 – Fleet of Siemens trains returned to M>Train (Melbourne, Australia) service, some minus livery.

November events
 November 3 – NYC Subway's "Redbird" R36 trains make final run from 42nd Street Times Square to Willets Point Shea Stadium.
 November 4 – A new intermodal service was inaugurated between Aiton, France, and Orbassano (near Turin), Italy, to transport complete trucks (both the tractor and trailer) and their loads. The trains include coach seating for the truck drivers.
 November 28 – SNCF (France) celebrates the one-billionth passenger on its TGV.

December events
 December 1 – JR West discontinued service on the Kabe Line between Kabe and Sandankyō stations.
 December 5 – Opening of  Severomuysky Tunnel on Baikal Amur Mainline after twenty-seven years’ construction.
 December 9 – The European Commission approved the franchise of the Trans-Pennine Express JV between Liverpool, Manchester, Newcastle and other northern England locations as a joint operation of FirstGroup and Keolis.
 December 17 – AirTrain JFK opened in New York City.
 December 20 – The KCR West Rail in Hong Kong started services.
 December – Great North Eastern Railway, operators of services on the East Coast Main Line between England and Scotland, began trials of 802.11b wireless LAN access to the Internet on their Mallard InterCity 225 trains.

Accidents
 January 3 – Ghatnandur train crash: A passenger train travelling from Secunderabad to Manmad, crashed into the rear end of a heavy goods train near Ghatnandur in Maharashtra, India, killing 18 people.
 January 27
 A head-on collision between an Italian and a French train in the Tende line's Biogna tunnel left two dead and four seriously injured.
 2003 Mumbai bombing: A bicycle bomb exploded near Vile Parle railway station in Mumbai, India, killing one person.
 January 31 – The Waterfall rail accident occurred near Waterfall, New South Wales, Australia. A train derailed, killing seven people on board.
 February 18 – An arsonist caused the Daegu subway fire when he set fire to a train stopped at the Joongang-ro (or Jungang-ro) station of the Daegu Metropolitan Subway in Daegu, South Korea.
 March 13 – 2003 Mumbai train bombing: A bomb in a ladies' compartment exploded as a train pulled into Mulund station, killing 10 people.
 May 15 – The Ladhowal rail disaster was a flash fire on the Frontier Mail train service in India, which engulfed three carriages. 39 people lost their lives.
 June 23 – The Vaibhavwadi train crash killed 53 people near the village of Vaibhavwadi in Sindhudurg district, Maharashtra in India.
 July 2 – The Warangal train crash killed 22 people in the town of Warangal, Andhra Pradesh, in India.
 October 7 – The Cahir viaduct on the Limerick–Rosslare railway line partly collapsed under a cement train travelling to Waterford. No one was hurt but the line remained closed until the following September for repairs to the bridge.
 December 5 – 2003 Stavropol train bombing: A suicide bomb blast on a Kislovodsk–Mineralnye Vody commuter train in Stavropol Krai as it was leaving Yessentuki killed at least 46 people and injured more than 170.

Deaths

June deaths
 June 10 – Livio Dante Porta, Argentinian steam locomotive mechanical engineer (born 1922).

Industry awards

Japan
 Awards presented by Japan Railfan Club
 2003 Blue Ribbon Award: Kintetsu 21020 series Urban Liner Next EMU
 2003 Laurel Prize: 
 Okayama Electric Tramway 9200 series "Momo" tramcar
 Kagoshima City Transportation Bureau 1000 series "U-tram" tramcar

North America 
2003 E. H. Harriman Awards

Awards presented by Railway Age magazine
 2003 Railroader of the Year: Richard K. Davidson (UP)
 2003 Regional Railroad of the Year: Indiana Harbor Belt Railroad
 2003 Short Line Railroad of the Year: San Joaquin Valley Railroad

United Kingdom 
Train Operator of the Year
 2003: Anglia Railways

References
Many of the events listed here were translated from 2003 dans les chemins de fer, the equivalent French-language Wikipedia article.